Derrin Horton is an American sportscaster based in Los Angeles, California.  He is a sports anchors for KTLA. Horton has also been a play-by-play announcer and anchor for ESPN and Fox Sports Net.

Early life and education
Horton was born in Washington, D.C., but grew up in Queens, New York. He graduated from the Holy Cross High School in Flushing, New York in 1986.

Horton attended S.I. Newhouse School of Public Communications at Syracuse University and graduated in 1991. At Syracuse, he worked at the student-run WAER station & Citrus TV, calling Syracuse Orange sports.

Career
Horton became a sportscaster for KCAL-TV in Los Angeles in 1998. This was before the CBS Corporation duopoly started and KCAL and KCBS consolidated their on-air and production teams.

He joined NFL Network at the start of the 2004 NFL season where he currently serves as an anchor, reporter and host. Horton provides in-depth interviews, post-game reports, and sideline reports for the Network. He also serves as the host and narrator for the Network's documentary series NFL Top 10.

Horton was also on an episode of Spike TV's Pros VS. Joes, in which he lost in overtime to Sal Masekela.

References

External links
 KTLA Profile

Year of birth missing (living people)
Living people
American television sports anchors
American television sports announcers
College basketball announcers in the United States
College football announcers
Holy Cross High School (Flushing) alumni
National Football League announcers
People from Flushing, Queens
S.I. Newhouse School of Public Communications alumni
Television anchors from Los Angeles
African-American television personalities